Maboussou, also spelled Mabousou, is a village located in Haut-Mbomou Prefecture, Central African Republic.

History 
On 28 July 2009, LRA raided Maboussou. They looted civilian's properties and a health post.

On 27 August 2009, 19 LRA fighters under the command of Major Olanya attacked Maboussou. They killed three people, raped one woman, and abducted eight villagers.

LRA militias attacked Maboussou on 20 March 2011. They looted food stores and abducted the villagers.

On 15 September 2014, LRA militias attacked the village. They abducted five people and looted food. Later, they freed four hostages. 

In 2019, Maboussou was controlled by UPC.

Facility 
Maboussou has one health post.

References 

Populated places in Haut-Mbomou